Isaac Williams is the name of:

Reverend Isaac Williams (1802–1865), British religious poet and prominent member of the Oxford Movement
Isaac Williams Jr. (1777–1860), U.S. Representative from New York
Isaac W. Williams, youth leader and activist
Isaac Williams (rancher) (1799–1856), fur trapper, rancher in Southern California

See also
Ike Williams (1923–1994), American boxer